Brigadier General Teymūr Khan Ayromlou, born Teymur-Xân Âyromlu, of Turkic Ayrum descent, was a prominent figure in the army of Persia at the start of the twentieth century. He was married to Malek os-Soltan. Queen Tâj ol-Moluk Âyromlou was his daughter. The notable General Muhammad-Husayn Ayrom was his nephew.

See also
Tadj ol-Molouk Ayromlou
Reza Shah

References 

Date of birth unknown
Date of death unknown
Imperial Iranian Army brigadier generals